Benjamin Mendy (born 17 July 1994) is a French professional footballer who plays as a left-back for  club Manchester City. He played for the France national team from 2017 until 2019.

After coming through Le Havre's youth academy, Mendy began his playing career with the club's reserve team in 2010, being promoted to the first team a year later. He remained with the club until 2013, when he joined Ligue 1 club Marseille. Mendy spent the next three seasons with Les Olympiens before leaving for Monaco, with whom he won the national championship in 2016–17. In the summer of 2017, Mendy moved to English club Manchester City on a then world-record transfer fee for a defender. He subsequently won the Premier League in his first season in England.

Mendy made his senior debut for France in 2017 after previously being capped by France youth teams at under-16, under-17, under-18, under-19 and under-21 levels. He was chosen in France's squad for the 2018 World Cup, which they won.

Club career

Le Havre
On 24 July 2011, Mendy signed his first professional contract,  a three-year contract with Ligue 2 club Le Havre. Mendy made his professional debut on 9 August 2011 in the team's 2–1 Coupe de la Ligue second-round defeat to Amiens.

Marseille
On 8 July 2013, Mendy signed for Ligue 1 club Olympique de Marseille. Mendy was signed by manager Élie Baup, who had led Marseille to a second-place finish and qualification for the 2013–14 UEFA Champions League in the previous season. He made his club and Ligue 1 debut on 11 August against Guingamp, and scored his first goal for Marseille on 24 September against Saint-Étienne. Mendy was in the squad for all six group-stage matches, and made his European debut on 1 October at Borussia Dortmund. However, Marseille lost all their group-stage matches while falling out of the competition, and Baup was sacked in favor of former club manager José Anigo. Mendy was sparingly used toward the end of the season by Anigo, and made just one start in Marseille's final fourteen games. His performance in the start, against Lille on 20 April 2014, was criticized by former Marseille left-back Éric Di Meco, who claimed he would "eat a rat" if Mendy ever made the French national team. After the season, Mendy was included on the 40-man shortlist for the 2014 Golden Boy award.

Mendy developed his game the following season under Argentinian manager Marcelo Bielsa, as Mendy claimed Bielsa had "given back to him the strength and aggressiveness lost last year." Mendy made 33 starts in the league in the 2014–15 campaign, getting 6 assists, as Marseille qualified for the Europa League. On 23 September 2015, Mendy was shown a straight red card shortly after coming on as a substitute against Toulouse, after he committed a professional foul on Toulouse's Jean-Daniel Akpa Akpro. Mendy would be given a two-match ban, and later missed a further 13 games for Marseille after picking up a hamstring injury against Caen in the Coupe de France on 3 January 2016.

Mendy played for five different managers in three seasons at the Stade Vélodrome. He made 101 competitive appearances with the club and had 14 assists to his name.

Monaco

On 22 June 2016, Olympique de Marseille's Ligue 1 rivals Monaco announced that they had signed Mendy on a five-year contract. Mendy made his debut for the club in the first leg of the Champions League third round against Turkish club Fenerbahçe on 27 July. On 18 December against Lyon in Ligue 1, Mendy was shown a red card for kicking at the backside of Lyon midfielder Corentin Tolisso. This was his second dismissal of the season after he was sent off in the play-off round of the Champions League against Villarreal. Mendy was banned for five matches for the incident, later reduced to four as he made his return against Lorient on 22 January 2017.

On 4 February, Mendy assisted two of Monaco's goals by crossing the ball to the scorers Valère Germain and Radamel Falcao in their 3–0 Ligue 1 home win over Nice. Mendy scored his first goal for Monaco in the Coupe de France against former club Marseille on 1 March. The goal, scored in extra time, gave Monaco a 3–2 lead, as Mendy also provided two assists in the 4–3 victory. Monaco made a run to the semi-finals of the Champions League, and Mendy provided 4 assists in the campaign before they were eliminated by Juventus.

Mendy was a key part of Monaco's 2016–17 Ligue 1 championship season, making 24 starts in the league for Les Monégasques under manager Leonardo Jardim. Monaco scored a league-leading 107 goals during the season, and Mendy was noted along with fellow full-back Djibril Sidibé for their forward play. On 16 May, Mendy was named to the 2017 UNFP Team of the Year, along with 5 of his teammates. The next day, Monaco clinched the Ligue 1 title against Saint-Étienne on the penultimate day of the season, their first in 17 seasons in what would be Mendy's final game with the club. After the season, Mendy was part of the exodus away from the Stade Louis II that included starlets Bernardo Silva, Tiémoué Bakayoko, and later Kylian Mbappé.

Manchester City
On 24 July 2017, it was announced that Premier League club Manchester City had signed Mendy on a six-year contract, for a fee reported to be £52m. The transfer fee eclipsed the previous record for a defender, set ten days prior by City on teammate Kyle Walker.

On 23 September 2017, Mendy sustained an injury against Crystal Palace, hurting his right knee in a challenge against Palace forward Andros Townsend. The club later confirmed that he had ruptured the anterior cruciate ligament in his knee, and he underwent surgery in Barcelona on 29 September. Mendy returned from injury on 22 April 2018, as a 75th-minute substitute for Fabian Delph in a game against Swansea City at the City of Manchester Stadium. This appearance gave him the minimum five league games required to receive a Premier League winners' medal.

In the 2018–19 season, Mendy played in 10 of the first 12 Premier League games for City, assisting five goals in the process. On 14 November 2018, days after the 3–1 win against Manchester United, it was announced Mendy had once again undergone surgery in Barcelona for a cartilage problem in his left knee, and was expected to be out for 12 weeks.

On 28 November 2020, Mendy scored his first goal for City in a 5–0 home league win over Burnley.

International career

Youth
Mendy was a French youth international, having represented his nation at under-16 and under-17 level. In 2011, he was a part of the under-17 team that reached the quarter-finals at the 2011 U-17 World Cup.

Senior
Mendy was called up to the senior France squad for the first time to face Luxembourg and Spain in March 2017. He made his debut on 25 March 2017 against the former, playing the whole game in a 3–1 2018 World Cup qualification away win.

On 17 May 2018, he was called up to the French squad for the 2018 World Cup in Russia. He played 40 minutes as a substitute in a goalless group game against Denmark as France won the tournament.

Personal life

Religious beliefs 
Mendy is a practising Muslim who has made the Hajj to Mecca.

Rape charges
On 26 August 2021, Cheshire Constabulary charged Mendy with four counts of rape and one count of sexual assault and remanded him in custody. The initial charges related to alleged offences against three different female complainants, all aged over 16, between October 2020 and August 2021. His application for bail was refused, as he had broken prior bail conditions imposed that he should not host any house parties. Manchester City suspended him pending a trial. Mendy appeared in court on 10 September and was remanded in custody. 

While he was in custody, Mendy was charged with three more counts of rape. On 7 January 2022, he was granted bail on condition that he live at his home address in Prestbury, Cheshire, not contact complainants and surrender his passport. Mendy pleaded not guilty on 22 May to seven charges of rape, one of attempted rape and one of sexual assault, relating to six complainants. On 1 June, Mendy was charged with an additional rape brought forward by a new complainant.

The trial began on 10 August 2022 at Chester Crown Court. Mendy was charged with eight rapes, one attempted rape and a sexual assault. He pleaded not guilty to all charges. The jury was made up of 14 jurors – eight men and six women – including two alternates, all of whom had to certify that they had no connection to Manchester City, Manchester United or the police.

On 13 September 2022, Mendy was found not guilty of one count of rape against a 19-year-old woman. Judge Stephen Everett told the jury to deliver a not guilty verdict after the prosecution decided not to pursue a guilty verdict on the one count. This was after footage emerged of the complainant having consensual sex with Mendy's co-accused, Louis Saha Matturie, on an occasion that she alleged was a rape.

On 13 January 2023, Mendy was found by a jury not guilty of six counts of rape and one count of sexual assault, while Matturie was found not guilty of six counts of rape and three of sexual assault; all verdicts were unanimous. The same jury could not reach a verdict on another count of rape and one count of attempted rape, so Mendy will undergo a retrial on those two charges on 26 June 2023.

Career statistics

Club

International

Honours
Marseille
Coupe de France runner-up: 2015–16

Monaco
Ligue 1: 2016–17
Coupe de la Ligue runner-up: 2016–17

Manchester City
Premier League: 2017–18, 2018–19, 2020–21
EFL Cup: 2019–20, 2020–21
FA Community Shield: 2018
UEFA Champions League runner-up: 2020–21

France
FIFA World Cup: 2018

Individual
UNFP Ligue 1 Team of the Year: 2016–17

Orders
Knight of the Legion of Honour: 2018

References

External links

Monaco profile 

1994 births
Living people
People from Longjumeau
Footballers from Essonne
French footballers
France youth international footballers
France under-21 international footballers
France international footballers
Association football defenders
Le Havre AC players
Olympique de Marseille players
AS Monaco FC players
Manchester City F.C. players
Ligue 1 players
Ligue 2 players
Premier League players
2018 FIFA World Cup players
FIFA World Cup-winning players
French expatriate footballers
Expatriate footballers in England
Expatriate footballers in Monaco
French expatriate sportspeople in England
French expatriate sportspeople in Monaco
Chevaliers of the Légion d'honneur
Black French sportspeople
French sportspeople of Senegalese descent
French Muslims
Prisoners and detainees of England and Wales
French prisoners and detainees
People acquitted of rape
People charged with rape